WYBY is an AM radio station serving the Ithaca market under a religious format. The station, licensed to Cortland, New York, broadcasts on AM frequency 920 kHz and is now a Bible Broadcasting Network Owned-and-operated station.

History
Prior to 2007, the station was known as WKRT and was a second-tier News/Talk station, featuring shows such as The Laura Ingraham Show, The Radio Factor, The Sean Hannity Show, Mike Gallagher, Jim Bohannon, The Kim Komando Show, and various other programs. Citadel Broadcasting, the owner of WKRT, sold their Ithaca cluster (including this station) to Saga Broadcasting, who in turn gave away the station for free to the Bible Broadcasting Network, presumably as a tax-deductible donation, to comply with FCC concentration limits in the Ithaca market due to their purchase of sister station WIII-FM, 99.9.

References

External links

 Bible Broadcasting Network - Station Info

Bible Broadcasting Network
Radio stations established in 1947
1947 establishments in New York (state)
YBY